Pontes e Lacerda is a municipality in the Brazilian state of Mato Grosso.

Location

Pontes e Lacerda is located 450 km from Cuiabá, at a latitude 15° 13'34" south and a longitude 59° 20'07" west, with an altitude of 254 meters. Its estimated population in 2020 was 45,774 inhabitants. It has an area of 8,423 square kilometers.

The municipality contains 73% of the  Serra de Santa Bárbara State Park, created in 1997.

Transportation 
The city is served by Pontes e Lacerda Airport.

References

Municipalities in Mato Grosso